Dint Island is a rocky island,  long. Probably first seen from the air by the United States Antarctic Service, 1939–41, it was first mapped from air photos taken by the Ronne Antarctic Research Expedition, 1947–48, by D. Searle of the Falkland Islands Dependencies Survey in 1960. It was so named by the UK Antarctic Place-Names Committee because a distinctive cirque makes a dent, or dint, on the south side of the island.

Location

The island lies roughly 6 miles (10 km) southeast of Umber Island.

See also 
 List of Antarctic and sub-Antarctic islands
 Umber Island
 Lazarev Bay

Further reading 
 Defense Mapping Agency  1992, Sailing Directions (planning Guide) and (enroute) for Antarctica, P 379

External links 

 Dint Island on USGS website
 Dint Island on SCAR website
 Dint Island on marineregions.org
 Dint Island distance calculator

References 

Islands of Alexander Island